This article lists the major power stations located in Beijing.

Non-renewable

Coal based

Natural gas based

Renewable

Hydroelectric

Pumped-storage

Wind

References 

 
Beijing